Tribolonotus is a genus of lizards, commonly known as crocodile skinks.

Geographic range
Species in the genus Tribolonotus are found in New Guinea, the Bismarck Archipelago, and the Solomon Islands.

Species
The genus includes the following 10 species: 

Nota bene: A binomial authority in parentheses indicates that the species was originally described in a genus other than Tribolonotus.

References

Further reading
Austin CA, Rittmeyer EN, Richards SJ, Zug GR (2010). "Phylogeny, historical biogeography and body size evolution in Pacific Island Crocodile skinks Tribolonotus (Squamata; Scincidae)". Molecular Phylogenetics and Evolution 57 (1): 227–236.
Boulenger GA (1887). Catalogue of the Lizards in the British Museum (Natural History). Second Edition. Volume III. ... Scincidæ ... London: Trustees of the British Museum (Natural History). (Taylor and Francis, printers). xii + 575 pp. + Plates I-XL. (Genus Tribolonotus, p. 364).
Duméril AMC, Bibron G (1839). Erpétologie générale ou Histoire naturelle complète des Reptiles, Tome cinquième [Volume 5]. Paris: Roret. viii + 854 pp. (Tribolonotus, new genus, pp. 364–366). (in French).

 
Lizard genera
Taxa named by André Marie Constant Duméril
Taxa named by Gabriel Bibron